Daram Khola is a river in Baglung, Nepal.

References 

Baglung District
Rivers of Gandaki Province